The National Institute of Design, Haryana (NIDH) is a design school in Umri, Kurukshetra, India. 
The Institute started functioning on 15 November  2016.  
The institute functions as an autonomous body under the Department of Industrial Policy and Promotion, Ministry of Commerce and Industry, of the Government of India.

History 
The Institute was established by the Government of India in 2016 based on the new Design Policy. Full time Director was appointed in January 2019. The classes were initially started from the transit campus at Government Polytechnic, Umri. Later in January, 2022, entire operations have been shifted to its brand new campus in new buildings.

Courses offered 
20 acre camp is being built  in the form of an endless knot at Kurukshetra along Grand Trunk Road. Currently the courses have been offered from a temporary campus at Polytechnic.

Courses offered 
The institute offers three main courses, textile and apparel design, industrial design and visual communication all of which follow the two semester per year pattern.

Admission 
Annual intake is of 75 seats. Admission to all the NIDs including NID Haryana is through a common entrance test called DAT (Design Aptitude Test). All students with Plus Two or equivalent qualification can appear for the test. The applications are normally open in November every year. The students appearing for the plus two exam also can apply.

See also
 List of institutions of higher education in Haryana

References

Universities and colleges in Haryana
Kurukshetra district
National Institutes of Design
Film schools in India
Design schools in India
Graphic design schools
Animation schools in India